Bradley John August (born 24 September 1978) is a South African former soccer player who played as a center-forward. He played club football for Hellenic, Lyngby, Santos, Ajax Cape Town, Maritzburg United, Ikapa Sporting and Vasco Da Gama and international football for South Africa.

International career
August has made 16 appearances for the South Africa national football team, his debut coming in a qualifying match for the 2000 African Nations Cup against Republic of the Congo on 3 September 2000.

References

1978 births
Living people
Cape Town Spurs F.C. players
Association football defenders
Association football midfielders
Association football forwards
Lyngby Boldklub players
Maritzburg United F.C. players
Soccer players from Cape Town
South African soccer players
South Africa international soccer players
South African expatriate soccer players
Association football utility players
Santos F.C. (South Africa) players
Danish Superliga players
Hellenic F.C. players
Expatriate men's footballers in Denmark
2002 African Cup of Nations players
Cape Coloureds
Ikapa Sporting F.C. players